Robert Scott "Bob" Christiansen (born May 8, 1949) is a former professional American football defensive tackle in the National Football League (NFL). He played for the Buffalo Bills in 1972.

For the 1971 season playing for the UCLA Bruins, he was named to the All-Conference First-team.  He played for Reseda High School.

References

1949 births
Living people
Sportspeople from Marshalltown, Iowa
Players of American football from Iowa
American football defensive tackles
UCLA Bruins football players
Buffalo Bills players